Anthony Laterza was the Akron Zips men's basketball head coach from 1960 to 1968.  In nine seasons, he guided the team to a 178–59 record. Laterza's winning percentage of .751 remains the best in the history of the program.  Under Laterza, the Zips won three Ohio Athletic Conference tournament championships.  His teams also made the Division II national tournament Final Four twice (1964 and 1966) and reached the championship game in 1964.

References

Year of birth missing
Year of death missing
Akron Zips football players
Akron Zips men's basketball coaches
Akron Zips men's basketball players
Basketball coaches from Ohio
Basketball players from Ohio
Players of American football from Ohio
American men's basketball players